The base course or basecourse in pavements is a layer of material in an asphalt roadway, race track, riding arena, or sporting field. It is located under the surface layer consisting of the wearing course and sometimes an extra binder course.

If there is a sub-base course, the base course is constructed directly above this layer. Otherwise, it is built directly on top of the subgrade. Generally consisting of a specific type of construction aggregate, it is placed by means of attentive spreading and compacting to a minimum of 95% relative compaction, thus providing the stable foundation needed to support either additional layers of aggregates or the placement of an asphalt concrete wearing course which is applied directly on top of the base course.

Aggregate base (AB) is typically made of a recipe of mixing different sizes of crushed rock together forming the aggregate which has certain desirable properties. An aggregate is normally made from newly quarried rock, or it is sometimes allowed to be made from recycled asphalt concrete and/or Portland cement concrete.

See also 
 Track bed

References

Pavement engineering
Road transport
Road infrastructure